The city mayor of Częstochowa (the title in Polish is "prezydent miasta Częstochowy", literal translation "President of Częstochowa") is the head of the executive of Częstochowa. The mayor is elected for a 5-year term in the local elections.

Current mayor 
The current mayor is Krzysztof Matyjaszczyk (Democratic Left Alliance), who took office on 10 December 2010.

Overview 
Legislative and local executive powers are exercised by the city council (rada miasta), the directly elected mayor (prezydent), and the city offices (urząd miasta).

Since 1990 to 2002 the President of Częstochowa had been elected by the city council.

Since 2002 the President of Częstochowa is elected by all of the citizens of Częstochowa.

1st election, 2002

2nd election, 2006

3rd election, 2010

4th election, 2014

5th election, 2018

See also 

 History of Częstochowa
 Częstochowa City Council

Notes and references 

Lists of mayors of places in Poland
Częstochowa